Lighthouse Point Park is a park in the city of New Haven, Connecticut that is operated as a New Haven city park. The 82-acre park is located at the eastern point of New Haven Harbor in the East Shore neighborhood, and affords a view of Downtown New Haven.

The park features the deactivated Five Mile Point Light, which is open for tours on special events, and the Lighthouse Point Carousel, which is operated seasonally. The 1911 carousel includes 69 horses, a camel (one of only three in the world), and two chariots. Park amenities include a sand beach area with a bath house, rest rooms and life guard, a boat launch, two pavilions, splash play area, playground, summer concession stand, fishing pier, picnic tables, grills and nature trails. In season, admission is free for New Haven residents, and non-residents and out-of-state residents pay a fee per vehicle.

Lighthouse Point Park abuts the Morris Creek Nature Preserve, a 20-acre salt marsh that is partly owned by the New Haven Land Trust.

The park is located on the Atlantic flyway, a major migration route for butterflies, hawks, and many other bird species, which makes it a popular site for bird watching. Events include the annual fall "Migration Festival at Lighthouse Point Park", bird watching walks, hawk displays, butterfly observations, and an annual hawk count.

See also 
Five Mile Point Light
Lighthouse Point Carousel

References

External links

Lighthouse Point Park

Parks in New Haven, Connecticut
Important Bird Areas of the United States